Worcester Commando was a light infantry regiment of the South African Army. It formed part of the South African Army Infantry Formation as well as the South African Territorial Reserve.

History

Origin
Worcester Commando was the second oldest unit in South African military history. It started as the Worcester Volunteer Rifles on 21 June 1883 and had many name changes over the years such as:
Western Rifles A Company
Worcester Skiet Kommando

Operations

With the UDF
This unit volunteered members for both World Wars and was involved in border duty during the Border War as well as during internal unrest.

The units banner was unveiled in 1910.

With the SADF
The unit received the Freedom of Worcester in 1982 and received its colours in 1992.

With the SANDF

Disbandment
This unit, along with all other Commando units was disbanded after a decision by South African President Thabo Mbeki to disband all Commando Units. The Commando system was phased out between 2003 and 2008 "because of the role it played in the apartheid era", according to the Minister of Safety and Security Charles Nqakula.

Unit emblems

Leadership

References

See also 
 South African Commando System

Infantry regiments of South Africa
South African Commando Units